Massimiliano Antonio "Max" Cavalera (born August 4, 1969) is a Brazilian musician. He co-founded the heavy metal band Sepultura in 1984 with his brother Igor Cavalera, and was the band's lead singer and rhythm guitarist until his departure in 1996. He currently plays in the heavy metal bands Soulfly, Cavalera Conspiracy and Killer Be Killed. Cavalera was also involved in a short-lived side project called Nailbomb.

Career and influences 
Max Cavalera's father, Graziano Cavalera, was an employee of the Italian Consulate in Belo Horizonte. He died at 41 years of age, when Max was nine years old. Cavalera's family was in a state of financial crisis and family turbulence when he formed Sepultura with his younger brother Igor. In the early 1990s, he relocated to Phoenix, Arizona. He did not begin to make spiritual music until after he quit Sepultura. His earlier lyrics for Soulfly were influenced by religion and spirituality, though he is critical of religion. His later albums, starting with Dark Ages, began to incorporate lyrical themes of violence, warfare, anger and hatred. His albums have all been dedicated to God, and he has often been depicted by the press as a man of religion, especially in the United States, something that Cavalera himself says he does not understand:

I do hate a lot of "religion", but people like Christ – yeah they inspire me. I mean if you look at Christ, He was hanging around with the lowlifes, prostitutes and the losers you know, not going around with those high society motherfuckers you see trying to sell Jesus today!

When asked in an interview whether he was a Christian and whether Soulfly was a Christian band, he said:

No. I mean, if I was a Christian I would wear all these different kinds of omens. Because Christian people are so close-minded. A priest would not accept that. So I don't like the concept of Christianity in terms of being so close-minded. It is the same with music. Sometimes I compare preachers to close-minded musicians or close-minded listeners, who only like one kind of music. Some preachers are the same. And they don't tolerate Hindus, Buddhists or whatever. Only them. It's bullshit. So Soulfly is not a Christian band at all. Very much opposite. But we are very spiritual. Spiritual has nothing to do with Christianity anyway. It has been here since the beginning of time.

In another interview, he was asked about the Varg Vikernes church burnings. He quoted, "I support church burnings 100 percent, but why don't we just burn everything. Mosques, temples, all religious buildings." However, he later claimed his views changed about the church burnings and called them "too violent". He has stated that he does believe in God, "But it might be different than the God the preacher preaches about."

Of enduring influence to his music, is the untimely death of his stepson, Dana Wells, who was killed in a car crash after the release of Roots in 1996. The songs "Bleed", "First Commandment", "Pain", "Tree of Pain" and "Revengeance" are tributes to Wells, as well as Deftones' song "Headup", in which Cavalera featured and co-wrote. He reunited with his brother Igor, in their band Cavalera Conspiracy, and wrote and performed on Soulfly's Conquer, released in 2008.

Cavalera appears in the 2009 video game Grand Theft Auto IV: The Lost and Damned as himself on the ingame radio station LCHC.

In 2013, Cavalera released his autobiography, titled My Bloody Roots; his co-writer was the British author Joel McIver and the book's foreword was written by Dave Grohl.

Guitar style 

Cavalera is known for playing his guitar with only four strings; with the B and high E strings opted out. The inspiration struck when he broke both strings one day and he did not bother to replace them. A friend later commented that the guitar looked better without them, thus it became his trademark. He used to play with three strings but eventually started playing with four due to Andreas Kisser writing a Sepultura song that required another string. He did go back to three temporarily when he was still doing Nailbomb.

Personal life 
Since 1992, Cavalera has lived in Phoenix, Arizona with his wife Gloria (b. 1953) and his five children: Igor Amadeus (b. 1995), Zyon (b. 1993), Jason (b. 1986), Richie (b. 1985), and Roxanne (b. 1983) and Dana (1985-1996). The three eldest, Gloria's children, were adopted by Cavalera, making Cavalera their legal father. Zyon, Igor, and Richie have all collaborated with Cavalera in his various projects. Three of his sons are also active in music, with Richie fronting Incite and Igor and Zyon performing in Lody Kong. Jason tours as Zyon's drum tech, amongst other various duties behind the scenes. In 2012 and 2013, Zyon toured with Soulfly after David Kinkade's retirement, and now he is a regular member as drummer. Igor briefly filled in as bassist for Soulfly in 2015 after Tony Campos left the band, and toured as keyboardist and co-vocalist during Soulfly's Point Blank Tour. Igor was born with type 1 diabetes, and Max and Gloria set up the "Iggy Fund" in 1998 to help other families get necessary medicine for their children with juvenile diabetes.

Collaborations 

Cavalera has collaborated with many different artists while in Sepultura and Soulfly. In 2003 he joined forces with former Nirvana drummer and Foo Fighters' frontman Dave Grohl to produce "Red War" for the self-titled release of Dave Grohl's metal project, Probot.

Musicians 
Cavalera has worked with the following musicians:

Cavalera appeared in The Mummy Returns in an off-camera role as the Scorpion King, providing the guttural screams for Dwayne Johnson.

On July 15, 2022 Demon Hunter released their single "Defense Mechanism" featuring Cavalera.

Discography
Sepultura
Bestial Devastation EP (1985)
Morbid Visions (1986)
Schizophrenia (1987)
Beneath the Remains (1989)
Arise (1991) US#119
Third World Posse EP (1993)
Chaos A.D. (1993) US#32 US Gold
Refuse/Resist EP (1994)
Roots (1996) US#27 US Gold
The Roots of Sepultura (1996)
Blood-Rooted (1997) US#162
Under a Pale Grey Sky (2002)

Nailbomb
Point Blank (1994)
Proud to Commit Commercial Suicide (1995)

Soulfly
Soulfly (1998) US#79 US Gold
Tribe EP (1999)
Primitive (2000) US#32
3 (2002) US#46
Prophecy (2004) US#82
Dark Ages (2005) US#155
Conquer (2008) US#66
Omen (2010) US#73
Enslaved (2012) US#82
Savages (2013) US#84
Archangel (2015) US#130
Ritual (2018)
Totem (2022)

Cavalera Conspiracy
Inflikted (2008) US#72
Blunt Force Trauma (2011) US#123
Pandemonium (2014) US#178
Psychosis (2017)

Killer Be Killed
Killer Be Killed (2014) US#58'Reluctant Hero (2020) US#47Go Ahead and DieGo Ahead and Die'' (2021)

References

External links

 NY Rock interview
 Asice.net interview

1969 births
Living people
Sepultura members
Soulfly members
Brazilian heavy metal singers
Brazilian heavy metal guitarists
Death metal musicians
Brazilian male guitarists
Brazilian male singer-songwriters
Brazilian singer-songwriters
Brazilian people of Italian descent
Brazilian expatriates in the United States
Cavalera Conspiracy members
Critics of religions
Brazilian deists
Brazilian autobiographers
English-language singers from Brazil
Musicians from Minas Gerais
People from Belo Horizonte
Musicians from Phoenix, Arizona
Rhythm guitarists
Brazilian session musicians
Nu metal singers
Guitarists from Arizona
20th-century American guitarists
American male guitarists
Nailbomb members
Killer Be Killed members
American musicians
Brazilian American